The Roman Catholic Diocese of Butembo-Beni is a diocese located in the cities of Butembo  and Beni in the Ecclesiastical province of Bukavu in the Democratic Republic of the Congo.

History
 April 9, 1934: Established as Mission “sui iuris” of Beni in Belgian Congo from the Apostolic Vicariate of Stanley Falls
 February 9, 1938: Promoted as Apostolic Vicariate of Beni in Belgian Congo
 November 10, 1959: Promoted as Diocese of Beni in Congo
 July 7, 1960: Renamed as Diocese of Beni
 February 7, 1967: Renamed as Diocese of Butembo-Beni

Bishops

Ordinaries, in reverse chronological order
 Bishops of Butembo-Beni (Latin Rite)
 Bishop Melchisedec Sikuli Paluku (since 1998.04.03)
 Bishop Emmanuel Kataliko (1966.05.17 – 1997.03.03), appointed Archbishop of Bukavu
 Bishop of Beni (Latin Rite) 
 Bishop Henri Joseph Marius Piérard, A.A. (1960.07.07 – 1966.05.17); see below
 Bishop of Beni in Congo (Roman rite) 
 Bishop Henri Joseph Marius Piérard, A.A. (1959.11.10 – 1960.07.07); see above & below
 Vicar Apostolic of Beni in Belgian Congo (Roman rite) 
 Bishop Henri Joseph Marius Piérard, A.A. (1938.02.09 – 1959.11.10); see above & below
 Ecclesiastical Superior of Beni in Belgian Congo (Roman rite) 
 Father Henri Joseph Marius Piérard, A.A. (1934 – 1938.02.09); see above

Other priest of this diocese who became bishop
Charles Kambale Mbogha, A.A. (priest here, 1969-1972), appointed Bishop of Wamba in 1990

See also
Roman Catholicism in the Democratic Republic of the Congo

Sources
 GCatholic.org
 Catholic Hierarchy

Roman Catholic dioceses in the Democratic Republic of the Congo
Christian organizations established in 1934
Roman Catholic dioceses and prelatures established in the 20th century
Roman Catholic Ecclesiastical Province of Bukavu